Sean Woodside (born October 16, 1970) is an American professional stock car racing driver. He is a veteran of what is now the ARCA Menards Series West, having raced in the series in the late 1990s to early 2000s, which included five full seasons, seven wins, and the 1999 series championship. During that time, Woodside also made at least one start in each of NASCAR's top three series.

Racing career

Motorsports career results

NASCAR
(key) (Bold – Pole position awarded by qualifying time. Italics – Pole position earned by points standings or practice time. * – Most laps led.)

Winston Cup Series

Busch Series

Craftsman Truck Series

West Series

References

External links
 

1970 births
NASCAR drivers
Living people
Racing drivers from California
People from Saugus, Santa Clarita, California